Flirty Fishing (FFing) is a form of evangelism by sexual intimacy practised from around 1974 to 1987 by the cult Children of God, currently known as Family International (TFI). Female members of Children of God, or "fisherwomen" would apply their sex appeal on "fish", men from outside the cult (often but not always having sex), using the occasion to proselytize for Jesus and seek donations. The practice was "a primary source of financial support and political protection" for the cult, and criticized as religious prostitution. Children of God have defended it  as a way of "bearing witness" for Jesus to people who would not otherwise be open to it.    According to some sources, over two hundred  thousand men were "fished", and over 10,000 babies were born to cult women from 1971 and 2001.  The practice was curtailed as sexually transmitted diseases spread through the cult, and then abandoned in 1987 reportedly because of the spread of AIDS.

Etymology, definition, rationale
The term is derived from Matthew 4:19 from the New Testament, in which Jesus tells two fishermen that he will make them "fishers of men".  Cult leader David Berg extrapolated from this that women in his movement should be "flirty fishers" (also called "bait" or "fisherwomen"). The targeted men were called "fish". The cult published several documents with exact instructions. Flirty Fishing was defined as using sex appeal for proselytizing. If masturbation, oral, or penetrative sex ensued, this was termed as "loving sexually", and also counted as a "deep witness", meaning that the "bait" earned more brownie points within the group than by mere flirting. Berg noted that Flirty Fishing did not necessarily entail intercourse, but that this was by far the most efficient method of proselytizing.

According to The Family's history,  "Father David [Berg] arrived at the rather shocking conclusion that Christians were therefore free through God's grace to go to great lengths to show the Love of God to others, even as far as meeting their sexual needs."  While  acknowledging that this interpretation scandalized "many religious institutions," The Family maintained that "many people, most of whom would never even go near a church, were reached and won to Christ through this very humble, honest, open and intimately human approach to witnessing."  A Family spokesman John Francis describes the main "fish" involved as "lonely traveling businessmen" staying in hotels.

Practice
The Children of God practised flirty fishing and escort servicing from 1974 until 1987, when it was officially abandoned, in part because of the AIDS epidemic.

Researcher Bill Bainbridge obtained data from TFI suggesting that, from 1974 until 1987, members had sexual contact with 223,989 people while practicing Flirty Fishing. As the women were expected to keep exact records of their "fruits" (successes), a 1988 statistic showed that more than 223,000 men had been "fished" since 1978—and that FFing had nevertheless continued into 1988. Though the cult had no problem ignoring Christian norms on fornication, it did follow "Christian fundamentalist underpinnings" when it came to birth control. Sources differ on whether birth control was  forbidden or simply discouraged. The practice also resulted in numerous pregnancies, the offspring of which were termed Jesus babies by the organization.  According to Don Lattin, between 1971 and 2001 "more than 13,000" children were born to followers of David Berg; “women with six, eight, 10, 13 kids were not uncommon” in the Family.   The "first child conceived through 'flirty fishing,' was born to Berg’s common-law wife, Karen Zerby", but was fathered by "a waiter she picked up in the Canary Islands."

Ex-member and critic, David Hiebert, states the practice was "used to curry political favor" in countries CoG had migrated to. "They would target special people -- in the media, lawyers, in the government." According to James Chancellor, 
Witnessing and disciple winning were by no means the only focus of Flirty Fishing. Even before 1978, FFing had become a primary source of financial support and political protection. Many female disciples established long-term relationships with wealthy or influential men. These men often provided money, food, clothing, housing, and other needs, including legal advice, help in immigration, and protection against social and political repression. It was not uncommon for some women to spend considerable amounts of time with their "fish", sometimes leaving their husbands and children for weeks or months at a time.

ESing 

The financial benefit of Flirty Fishing soon advanced from mere flirting/"loving sexually", to "escort servicing" (ESing)—described as "making FFing pay" by Berg—in which female cult members would work as regular call girls for escort agencies or freelance, and "witness" (proselytize) to their clients merely when the occasion offered itself.

According to author James Chancellor,
In some areas of Asia, Europe and Latin America, female disciples went to work for escort services, providing sex for a fixed fee. Though conceding that escort service work (ESing) perhaps crossed the line, Family leadership insists that Flirty Fishing was not prostitution because the ultimate goal was always to bear witness or support the witness for Jesus."

Impact on members and criticism

Women who objected to being what the cult itself bluntly described as "God's whores" or "hookers for Jesus" were admonished not to "let self and pride enter in", and reminded that their body did not really belong to them, as according to 1 Corinthians 6:19–20 it had been "bought" (by Jesus through his crucifixion) "with a price". After an initial phase, male members no longer partook in this drive, partially because of the cult's dismissive stance toward homosexuality, but also because Berg thought it did not "pay off financially". Many of the flirty fishers had boyfriends, were married, or had children. In Family publications, flirty fishers and escort service practitioners (see below) frequently reported that they found their work hard, dangerous and exhausting.

Critical ex-members of CoG also point to Family publications from this period. A 1987 "Basic Training Handbook,"  offers "explicit advice on sex among prepubescent teens. There's also something called 'My Little Fish' containing nude photographs of a young boy and an adult woman embracing."

Flirty Fishing has been compared to prostitution. One scholar, (Susan Raine) describes its "terminology and ... imagery"  as "saturated with the rhetoric of prostitution". Describing a couple of images from internal Children of God literature on FFing sent by Berg to Children of God communes and later released by ex-members,  Raine says one is "of a woman wearing hot pants, a bra, and high-heeled boots ... dangling a fishhook from her hand ... the caption below reads ‘FISHERS OF MEN!’".  Another "portrays a woman as a mermaid impaled on a hook, but embracing a man, this time with the heading ‘HOOKER FOR JESUS’" (One "Mo Letter" written by  David Berg and distributed to members of CoG was entitled "God's Whores?".)

See also
 Love bombing
 Love Jihad

References

External links
 The History and Theological Premise of Flirty Fishing (1977-1987) on davidberg.com.
 Flirty Fishing on xFamily.org a wiki about the Children of God.  Warning: Explicit drawings.
 

The Family International
Prostitution in the United States
Sexuality in Christianity

fr:Flirty-fishing